John McKenzie Downey (9 August 1921 – 12 May 2006) was an Australian sailor. He competed for Australia at two Olympic Games in the Star class in 1956 and 1960. Downey was born in Hawthorn, Victoria, Australia.

References

External links
 Jack Downey at the Australian Olympic Committee

1921 births
2006 deaths
Australian male sailors (sport)
Olympic sailors of Australia
Sailors at the 1956 Summer Olympics – Star
Sailors at the 1960 Summer Olympics – Star
Sportsmen from Victoria (Australia)
Sportspeople from Melbourne
People from Hawthorn, Victoria
20th-century Australian people